The Marcel Benoist Prize, offered by the Marcel Benoist Foundation, is a monetary prize that has been offered annually since 1920 to a scientist of Swiss nationality or residency who has made the most useful scientific discovery.  Emphasis is placed on those discoveries affecting human life. Since 1997, candidates in the humanities have also been eligible for the prize.

The Marcel Benoist Foundation was established by the will of the French lawyer Marcel Benoist, a wartime resident of Lausanne, who died in 1918. It is managed by a group of trustees comprising the Swiss interior minister and heads of the main Swiss universities. It is often dubbed the "Swiss Nobel Prize."

History 

The first award was given to immunologist Maurice Arthus (1862–1945) at the University of Lausanne.  Other winners have included computer scientist Niklaus Wirth, astronomer Michel Mayor, and cardiologist Max Holzmann. , eleven Marcel Benoist winners have later also won the Nobel Prize: Paul Karrer, Leopold Ruzicka, Walter R. Hess, Tadeus Reichstein, Vladimir Prelog, Niels Kaj Jerne, Johannes G. Bednorz, Karl. Alexander Müller, Richard R. Ernst, Kurz Wüthrich, and Michel Mayor.

In 2009, Françoise Gisou van der Goot (École polytechnique fédérale de Lausanne) was the first woman to win the Marcel Benoist Prize.

Laureates 

 1920: Maurice Arthus
 1921: Conrad Brunner
 1922: Paul Karrer
 1923: Albert Heim
 1924: Heinrich Zangger
 1925: Alfred Gysi
 1926: Emile Argand
 1927: Hermann Sahli
 1928: Jules Gonin
 1929: Paul Niggli
 1930: Aloys Müller
 1931: Walter R. Hess
 1932: Maurice Lugeon
 1933: Robert Doerr
 1934: Max Askanazy
 1935: Jakob Eugster
 1936: Alfredo Vannotti
 1937: Charles Dhéré
 1938: Leopold Ruzicka
 1939: Fritz Baltzer
 1940: Friedrich T. Wahlen
 1941: Hermann Mooser
 1942: Arthur Stoll
 1943: Paul Scherrer
 1944: 
 1945: Ernst Albert Gäumann
 1946: Alexander von Muralt
 1947: Tadeus Reichstein
 1948: Hans E. Walther
 1949: Albert Frey-Wyssling
 1950: Emile Guyénot
 1951: Anton Fonio
 1952: Otto Gsell
 1953: Alfred Fleisch
 1954: Ernst Hadorn
 1955: Max Holzmann
 1956: Siegfried Rosin
 1957: Jakob Seiler
 1958: Klaus Clusius
 1959: Albert Wettstein
 1960: Pierre Duchosal
 1961: Werner Kuhn
 1962: Alfred Hässig
 1963: Gerold Schwarzenbach
 1964: Vladimir Prelog
 1965: Georges de Rham
 1966: Edouard Kellenberger and Alfred Tissières
 1967: Kurt Mühlethaler and Hans J. Moor
 1968: Michel Dolivo
 1969: Walter Heitler
 1970: Charles Weissmann
 1971: Manfred Bleuler
 1972: Albert Eschenmoser
 1973: Lucien Girardier, Eric Jéquier and Georges Spinnler
 1974: Ewald Weibel
 1975: M. Gazi Yasargil
 1976: Theodor K. Brunner, Jean Charles Cerottini and Jean Lindenmann
 1977: Hans Günthard and Edgar Heilbronner
 1978: Niels Kaj Jerne
 1979: Michel Cuénod
 1980: Hans Kummer
 1981: Karl Illmensee
 1982: Franz Fankhauser
 1983: Hans R. Brunner
 1984: Harald Reuter
 1985: Richard R. Ernst
 1986: Johannes G. Bednorz and Karl Alexander Müller
 1987: Maurice E. Müller, Martin Allgöwer and Hans R. Willenegger
 1988: Ulrich Laemmli
 1989: Niklaus Wirth
 1990: Bruno Messerli, Hans Oeschger and Werner Stumm
 1991: Duilio Arigoni and Kurt Wüthrich
 1992: Gottfried Schatz
 1993: no prize
 1994: Martin Schwab
 1995: Henri Isliker and Alfred Pletscher
 1996: Bernard Rossier
 1997: Jürg M. Fröhlich
 1998: Michel Mayor
 1999: Jörg Paul Müller and Luzius Wildhaber
 2000: Dieter Seebach
 2001: 
 2002: Rüdiger Wehner
 2003: Denis Duboule
 2004: Adriano Aguzzi
 2005: Othmar Keel
 2006: Timothy J. Richmond
 2007: Ari Helenius
 2008: Ernst Fehr
 2009: Françoise Gisou van der Goot (first time that the prize is awarded to a woman)
 2010: Daniel Loss
 2011: Michele Parrinello
 2012: Michael N. Hall
 2013: Michael Grätzel
 2014: Nicolas Gisin
 2015: Laurent Keller
 2016: Johan Auwerx
 2017: Thomas Stocker
 2018: Lars-Erik Cederman
 2019: Nicola Spaldin
 2020: Rudolf Aebersold
 2021: Thomas Berger

See also 

 List of general science and technology awards 
 Science and technology in Switzerland
 Prizes named after people
 Latsis Foundation
 Louis-Jeantet Prize for Medicine

References

External links
 Official website

Benoist
Benoist
Benoist
Benoist Prize